Lovitz is a surname. Notable people with the surname include:

Daniel Lovitz (born 1991), American professional soccer player
Jon Lovitz (born 1957), American comedian, actor, and singer
Jonathan Lovitz (born 1984), American LGBT rights advocate and actor